The New Hampshire Liberty Forum is an annual convention-style conference hosted by the Free State Project. It has attracted attendees such as U.S. Presidential candidates, a sitting U.S. Senator, a sitting U.S. Representative, state legislators, well-known businesspersons, entrepreneurs, and numerous policy institutes.

The conference is one of two annual events hosted by the Free State Project in an effort to recruit 20,000 individuals with libertarian ideals to move to New Hampshire, the other being the Porcupine Freedom Festival. As of February 3, 2016, the group has 20,000 participants signed on, hence completing the original goal. The signatories are now expected to move to New Hampshire by 2022, 5 years after the end of the drive.

2016 conference
The 2016 New Hampshire Liberty Forum was held from February 18 through February 21, 2016 at the Radisson Hotel in Manchester, New Hampshire. The theme of the 2016 conference was "Living Liberty," which focused on participants who had already moved to New Hampshire and how they are exploring and expanding their personal liberties there.

NSA whistleblower Edward Snowden gave the keynote speech, via live video stream  from his exile in Russia. Lyn Ulbricht spoke and shared an update on the appeal trial of her son, Ross Ulbricht, sentenced to life in prison without the possibility of parole for allegedly creating a darknet market named Silk Road under the pseudonym Dread Pirate Roberts.

2015 conference
The 2015 conference was held on March 5 through March 8, 2015 at the Radisson Hotel in Manchester, New Hampshire. The event was branded using dark blue, light blue, white, and gold theming. The logo featured a stylized map of New Hampshire, divided into polygonal shapes using the branding colors of the event, but introducing different green and blue shades which were only present in the logo. The slogan of the event was "Moved By Liberty".

The event featured a media room, various speakers organized into interest-based tracks, a vendor showcase, children's activities, and art workshops. Event tickets were sold in tiers, and many attendees of the event were also entitled to catered meals for lunch and dinner, a brunch, access to snacks, and both alcoholic and non-alcoholic beverages with purchase of the VIP-tier ticket, which permitted access to the hospitality suite.

In contrast with previous events and aligning with the creation of interest-specific tracks, speakers for the 2015 event were not designated 'keynote' speakers. Despite this shift, scheduling changes caused by January 2015 North American blizzard and subsequent winter storms caused more than one formal event host to declare that a 'keynote speaker' had been rescheduled.

Speakers
 Amanda Bouldin – New Hampshire State Representative
 Andrew Hemingway – Gubernatorial candidate in New Hampshire
 Ben Swann – Emmy Award-winning journalist
 Bob Hull – New Hampshire State Representative
 Bob Wilkins – Founder Zftr, ZftrCoin
 Branden Petersen – US Senator District 35, Minnesota
 Carl Soderberg – Founder, Able Ebinezer Brewing Company
 Carla Gericke – President, Free State Project
 Carlos Morales – Author, "Legally Kidnapped, The Case Against Child Protective Services"
 Carol McGuire – Four-term New Hampshire State Representative
 Catherine Cadden – Author, "Peaceable Revolution Through Education"
 Charlie Arlinghaus – President, Josiah Bartlett Center For Public Education
 Chris Mercogliano – Author, Making It Up As We Go Along, The Story of the Albany Free School, and Teaching The Restless.
 Dan McGuire – Three-term New Hampshire State Representative
 David Boaz – Executive Vice President, CATO Institute
 David Kelley – Author, doctorate – The Sciences, Reason, Harvard Business Review, Unrugged Individualism: The Selfish Basis of Benevolence, The Art of Reasoning
 Edward Hudgins – Editor, Regulation.
 Evan Pierce – Artist, Bardo Farm
 Francois-Rene Dang Vu Ban Rideau – (Name Anglicized) – Blogger, Futurist.
 Ian Freeman – Director, LRN.FM. Host, Free Talk Live
 Ian Underwood – Founding Owner, Bardo Project. Researcher (physics, computer science), NASA
 James Otteson – Executive Director, BB&T Center for the Study of Capitalism, doctorate.
 Jared Chicoine – State Campaign Director, Ron Paul 2012.
 Jason Sorens – Author, Announcement: The Free State Project, doctorate.
 Jeffrey Tucker – Founder, Liberty.me. Author, Bourbon For Breakfast
 Jesse Wiens – Founder, ZENVC
 Jody Underwood – Founder/owner Bardo Farm, doctorate.
 Jon Herdman – Founder, Mental Health Is Not a Crime
 Kevin Bloom – Political director, New Hampshire Liberty Alliance
 Kirk McNeil – Co-founder, Church of the Sword
 Lee Webster – Founder, director – New Hampshire Funeral Resources, Education & Advocacy
 Louis Calitz – Technology entrepreneur, CTO FreeStateProject.org
 Lyn Ulbricht – Motivational speaker
 Mark Warden – Principal, Porcupine Real Estate
 Matthew Ping – Founder, Ledgeview Commercial Partners
 Matt Simon – Former executive director, Marijuana Policy Project
 Mier G. Kohn – Professor of economics, Dartmouth College
 Michelle Levell – Director, School Choice New Hampshire
 Mike Vine – Organizer, Porcfest X and Freecoast Festival
 Nick Gillespie – Editor-in-chief, Reason.com.
 Ofer Nave – Co-founder, The Porcupine Clubhouse
 Patrick M. Byrne – CEO, Overstock.com
 Paul Best – chairman, New Hampshire Liberty Alliance
 Peter St. Onge – Editor, Austrian Investment Monthly
 Richard Mack – Founder, Constitutional Sheriffs and Peace Officers Association
 Rick Broussard – Editor, New Hampshire Magazine
 Sam Eaton – Owner, FanConx.com
 Sandy Pierre – Editor, Shire Liberty News
 Saul Anuzis – Managing partner, Coast To Coast Strategies
 Scott Horton – Host, Antiwar Radio
 Seamas O' Scaladidhe – (Name Anglicized) – Treasurer, Free State Project. Principal, GenCourtMobile.
 Seth Hipple – Co-founder, Martin & Hipple, esquire.
 Shem Kellogg – New Hampshire State Representative
 Tim O'Flaherty – Research director, New Hampshire Liberty Alliance
 William Ruger – Vice president, research and policy at Charles Koch Institute, doctorate.
 William Thomas – Author, Radicals for Capitalism; Editor, The Literary Art of Ayn Rand

2014 conference
The 2014 conference was held from February 20 to 23, 2014 at the Crowne Plaza Hotel in Nashua, New Hampshire.

Keynote speakers
 Naomi Wolf – author of The End of America: Letter of Warning to a Young Patriot and Give Me Liberty: A Handbook for American Revolutionaries
 Thomas Andrews Drake – a former senior executive of the U.S. National Security Agency and a whistleblower
 Jesselyn Radack – a former ethics adviser to the United States Department of Justice and a whistleblower

Speakers
 Jeffrey Tucker – executive editor of Laissez Faire Books and Distinguished Fellow of the Foundation for Economic Education
 Ben Swann – Edward R. Murrow Award and Emmy Award winning journalist, and an internet phenomenon with over 10 million video views
 Trevor Timm – co-founder and executive director of the Freedom of the Press Foundation and activist at the Electronic Frontier Foundation
 Ken White – criminal defense attorney and blogger at Popehat
 Travis Brown – state lobbyist, author of How Money Walks
 Kashmir Hill – senior online editor at Forbes, writing about the intersection of law, technology, social media and personal information
 Cody Wilson – co-founder of Defense Distributed
 Ben Falk – resilient site development and permaculture expert with Whole Systems Design LLC
 Aaron Day – Chairman of the Republican Liberty Caucus of New Hampshire and CEO of the Atlas Society
 Dan Alban – an attorney with the Institute for Justice who litigates cutting-edge constitutional cases protecting free speech, property rights, economic liberty and other individual liberties
 Bill Buppert – expert on irregular warfare and revolutionary movements, author of ZeroGov
 James Bovard – libertarian author and journalist
 James O'Keefe – journalist whose investigations have exposed corruption and malfeasance in major taxpayer-funded institutions, including ACORN, Planned Parenthood and NPR

2013 conference
The 2013 conference was held from February 21 to 24, 2013 at the Crowne Plaza Hotel in Nashua, New Hampshire.

Keynote speakers
 Jack Spirko – creator/host of The Survival Podcast, winner of the People's Choice Podcast Award in 2010
 Thomas Woods – American historian, political analyst, and New York Times-bestselling author

Speakers
 Vermin Supreme – American performance artist, anarchist and political activist
 Ben Stone – host of the Bad Quaker podcast
 Aaron Day – CEO of the Atlas Society
 Lee Doren – author and activist
 Jeffrey Tucker – executive editor of Laissez Faire Books
 Erik Voorhees – Bitcoin entrepreneur 
 Roger Ver – Bitcoin entrepreneur
 Julie Borowski – YouTube channel host and Freedomworks activist
 Thaddeus Russell – professor, author, historian and cultural critic
 Pete Eyre – former Bureaucrash Crasher-in-Chief and Liberty On Tour co-creator 
 Katherine Albrecht – founder of Consumers Against Supermarket Privacy Invasion and Numbering (CASPIAN)
 Carla Gericke – President of the Free State Project
 John Bush – Texas based liberty activist and host of the reality show Sovereign Living
 Tarrin Lupo – anarcho-capitalist author and cohost of the podcast Wheels Off Liberty
 Kira Peikoff – author
 Cory Doctorow – journalist, science fiction author and proponent of Creative Commons

2012 conference
The 2012 conference was held from February 23 to 26. The Second Amendment Sisters of New Hampshire sponsored a firearm safety class and shoot, and the New Hampshire Liberty Alliance offered a tour of the New Hampshire State House.

Keynote speakers
 Peter Schiff – Austrian School economic commentator and owner of Euro Pacific Capital
 Joel Salatin – farmer, lecturer, and author whose books include "You Can Farm" and "Salad Bar Beef"

Speakers
 Jodie Emery – editor of Cannabis Culture online magazine 
 John Lott – economist and author
 Sharon Presley – co-founder of Laissez Faire Books
 Michael Boldin – founder and executive director of the Tenth Amendment Center 
 Michael Cloud – author, speech writer and president and co-founder of the Center For Small Government
 John Bush – Texas based liberty activist

2011 conference
The 2011 conference was scheduled for February 24–27 in Nashua, New Hampshire but in December 2010, it was announced by Free State Project President Varrin Swearingen that the 2011 conference would be canceled. A primary reason for the cancellation included slow ticket sales after the event announcement was delayed partially due to the keynote speaker unexpectedly backing out.

2010 conference
The 2010 conference was held from March 18 through March 21 in Nashua, New Hampshire, at the Crowne Plaza Hotel.

Keynote speakers
 Judge Andrew Napolitano – former New Jersey Superior Court Judge, former host of Freedom Watch and senior judicial analyst on the FOX business network
 NH State Rep. Dan Itse – sitting New Hampshire State Representative
 Jacob Hornberger – founder and president of The Future of Freedom Foundation, a libertarian educational foundation

Speakers
 Angela Keaton – development director of Antiwar.com, producer of Antiwar Radio; serves on the boards of Outright Libertarians and Ladies of Liberty Alliance
 Brad Spangler – Director of the Center for a Stateless Society, proponent of agorism
 Brett Veinotte – host of School Sucks Podcast
 Catherine Bleish – Executive Director of the Liberty Restoration Project
 Charles W. Johnson – individualist-anarchist writer and activist, founding member of the Alliance of the Libertarian Left, occasional columnist; writes at radgeek.com
 Daniel J. Mitchell – libertarian economist, Senior Fellow at the Cato Institute
 David D. Friedman – author of "The Machinery of Freedom"; holds A.B. from Harvard University, Ph.D. in Physics from the University of Chicago
 Devin S. Standard – firearms instructor, accomplished martial artist, hunter
 Eddie Allen – International Currency Director for the American Open Currency Standard
 Ernest Hancock – publisher of FreedomsPhoenix, host of "Declare Your Independence" on the Liberty News Radio Network and the Republic Broadcasting Network; best known as creator of the Ron Paul r3VOLution logo
 Jason Talley – author, contributes to fr33agents.net
 Jenn Coffey – National Coordinator of the Second Amendment Sisters, elected NH State Representative
 Kelley Vlahos – contributing editor for The American Conservative magazine and its blog; political writer for Foxnews.com, regular columnist for Antiwar.com
 Kenneth W. Royce – aka "Boston T. Party", founder of Free State Wyoming, shooting instructor, speaker, author of books on guns, history, law, politics, and government
 Michele Seven – mother taking up her case against the IRS
 Pasha Roberts – producer/director of the movie "Silver Circle" (silvercirclemovie.com)
 Radley Balko – journalist, senior editor for Reason magazine, and blogs at theagitator.com
 Scott Bieser – cartoonist, former video game animator
 Shelly Roche – libertarian activist with a podcast at ByteStyle.tv; computer programmer, entrepreneur
 Skip Coryell – founder of the Second Amendment March; author of seven books related to personal defense and 2nd Amendment activism; Chief Instructor and co-owner of Midwest Tactical Training
 Stewart Rhodes – founder and director of Oath Keepers; former firearms instructor and former member of Ron Paul’s D.C. staff.
 Thomas Naylor – co-founder of the Second Vermont Republic; author, Professor Emeritus of Economics at Duke University 
 Tom Baugh – entrepreneur, inventor; author of "Starving the Monkeys: Fight Back Smarter"
 Tom Mullen – author of "A Return to Common Sense: Reawakening Liberty in the Inhabitants of America"
 William Norman Grigg – award-winning investigative journalist and author; blogs at freedominourtime.blogspot.com

Additionally, members of the Liberty Caravan (libertycaravan.org) spoke about their journey to New Hampshire.

2009 conference
The 2009 conference was held from March 5 through March 8 in Nashua, New Hampshire, at the Crowne Plaza Hotel.

Keynote speakers
 Dick Heller – brought suit against Washington D.C. with the Bill of Rights Foundation, and together they overturned the D.C. ban on handguns. Mr. Heller is a participant in the Free State Project.
 Dr. Mary Ruwart – author and 2008 LP Presidential candidate
 Stefan Molyneux – host of Freedomain Radio

Speakers
 Charles Arlinghaus – president of the free-market Josiah Bartlett Center for Public Policy
 David Bergland – Libertarian Party (LP) Presidential candidate, activist, and author
 Will Buchanan – from the Walk For Liberty
 Jenn Coffey – National Coordinator of the Second Amendment Sisters, & elected New Hampshire State Representative
 Pete Eyre – Bureaucrash Crasher-in-Chief
 Gary Franchi – National Director of Aaron Russo's Restore the Republic
 Patri Friedman – Executive Director of the Seasteading Institute
 John Taylor Gatto – author of numerous books including "Dumbing Us Down: The Hidden Curriculum of Compulsory Schooling"
 Anthony Gregory – Research Analyst at the Independent Institute
 Dan Itse – New Hampshire state representative who introduced States' Rights bill HCR 0006
 Glenn Jacobs – WWE wrestler "Kane", Free State Project member, creator of the blog Adventures of Citizen X
 Angela Keaton – Development Director from AntiWar.com
 Adam Kokesh – from Iraq Veterans Against the War
 Tom Mullen – author of "A Return to Common Sense"
 Ethan Nadelmann – founder and executive director of the Drug Policy Alliance
 Evan Nappen – lawyer and author of "New Hampshire Gun, Knife, and Weapon Law"
 David Nolan – founder of the Libertarian Party
 Kenneth Royce (Boston T. Party) – author of books on guns, history, law, politics, and government
 Matt Simon – Director of NH Common Sense Marijuana Policy
 Lisa Snell – Director of Education and Child Welfare, Reason Foundation
 Marc Stevens – author of "Adventures in Legal Land"
 Deborah Stevenson – Executive Director of National Home Education Legal Defense
 Aaron David Ward  – libertarian comedian

2008 conference
The 2008 conference was held from January 3 through January 6 in Nashua at the Crowne Plaza Hotel. Moved to first weekend in January based on predicted New Hampshire primary date of Tuesday, January 8, 2008, which came to pass.
Slogan: Moving Liberty Forward

Keynote speakers
 Bernard von NotHaus – currency architect and creator of the Liberty Dollar
 John E. Sununu – Republican United States Senator from New Hampshire
 Ron Paul – U.S. Congressman from 14th district of Texas and Republican Presidential Candidate

Speakers
 Sharon Harris – president of Advocates for Self Government
 F. Paul Wilson – author the Repairman Jack series
 Bob Schulz – Chairman of the We the People Foundation
 Barry Cooper – from NeverGetBusted.com
 Jim Babka – president of the Downsize DC Foundation
 Peter Christ – founder of Law Enforcement Against Prohibition (LEAP)
 Tom Eddlem – host of Dangerous Talk and blogger at LewRockwell.com
 Gardner Goldsmith – author and host of Against the Grain
 Don Gorman – political director for the New Hampshire Liberty Alliance
 Christopher Gronski – creator of DestinationFreedom.org and NH coordinator for the We the People Foundation
 John McManus – President of the John Birch Society
 Tyler Stearns – student, named "2007 Liberty Activist of the Year" by the New Hampshire Liberty Alliance
 Wayne Green – creator of Byte magazine and of NH To Do
 Lydia Harman – realtor, Integrity Plus Investments & Real Estate
 Carla Howell – from the Center for Small Government

2007 conference
Held in Concord, from February 22 to February 25, 2007. 
Slogan: Attaining Personal and Economic Freedom in America's Freest State

Keynote speakers
 John Stossel – co-anchor of ABC's 20/20, called "the most consistently thought-provoking TV reporter of our time".
 Michael Badnarik – 2004 Libertarian Party presidential candidate, and author of Good To Be King: The Foundation of Our Constitutional Freedom.

Speakers

 Ron Paul (video, audio) – U.S. Congressman from Texas's 14th congressional district
 Jim Babka – president of the Downsize DC Foundation
 Jack Cole – executive director of Law Enforcement Against Prohibition (LEAP)
 Bill Westmiller – national chairman of the Republican Liberty Caucus
 Rob Kampia – executive director of the Marijuana Policy Project
 Jim Harper – director of information policy studies at the Cato Institute
 Joe McQuaid – Publisher of New Hampshire's statewide newspaper, The Union Leader
 Geoffrey Segal – director of government reform for the Reason Foundation
 Christopher Gronski – New Hampshire coordinator for the We the People Foundation
 Don Gorman – political director for the New Hampshire Liberty Alliance
 Lydia Harman – realtor, Integrity Plus Investments & Real Estate

See also
 Free State Project
 Jason Sorens
 Porcupine Freedom Festival

References

External links
 Official site

Libertarianism in the United States
Political events in New Hampshire
Annual events in New Hampshire